The Beverly Hills Post was a periodical publication of Beverly Hills, California. It was founded in 1928 as the Pico Post.  The tabloid-sized newspaper stopped publication in mid-April 1994 because of a divorce between the owners, Margaret "Peggy" Harris, and her husband, Walter. The closing of this newspaper left the Beverly Hills Courier as the only newspaper in the city until the founding of Beverly Hills Weekly in 1999, and later revival under new management.

References

See also 
 The Beverly Hills Courier
 Beverly Hills Weekly
 Canyon News

Newspapers published in Beverly Hills, California
Defunct weekly newspapers
Publications established in 1928
Publications disestablished in 1994
Defunct newspapers published in California